Lahcen Ahidous (born 13 April 1945) is a Moroccan boxer. He competed at the 1964 Summer Olympics and the 1968 Summer Olympics.

References

1945 births
Living people
Moroccan male boxers
Olympic boxers of Morocco
Boxers at the 1964 Summer Olympics
Boxers at the 1968 Summer Olympics
Sportspeople from Casablanca
Mediterranean Games silver medalists for Morocco
Mediterranean Games medalists in boxing
Competitors at the 1967 Mediterranean Games
Middleweight boxers
20th-century Moroccan people